Donald Muddle (born 26 July 1937) is an Australian cricketer. He played in eleven first-class matches for Queensland between 1956 and 1961.

See also
 List of Queensland first-class cricketers

References

External links
 

1937 births
Living people
Australian cricketers
Queensland cricketers
Cricketers from Brisbane